The Washington meridians are four meridians that were used as prime meridians in the United States and pass through Washington, D.C. The four which have been specified are:
 through the Capitol
 through the White House
 through the old Naval Observatory
 through the new Naval Observatory.

Their longitudes may be reported in three ways:
 relative to the local vertical used by astronomic observations
 relative to NAD 27 (North American Datum 1927), an ellipsoid of revolution that is at mean sea level beneath triangulation station Meades Ranch, Kansas (not Earth-centered);
 relative to NAD 83, an Earth-centered ellipsoid of revolution with dimensions chosen to best fit the undulating (±100 m) geoid (world-wide mean sea level).

NAD83 longitude of the Capitol is about 1.1 arc seconds less than its NAD27 longitude; astronomic longitude there is about 4 arc seconds less than NAD83.

Capitol meridian
Pierre (Peter) Charles L'Enfant specified the first meridian in his 1791 "Plan of the city intended for the permanent seat of the government of the United States . . ." He wrote this name on his "Plan of the city intended for the permanent seat of the government of t(he) United States ...." (Washington, D.C.) and on other legal documents. However, during the early 1900s, a French ambassador to the U.S., Jean Jules Jusserand, poipularized the use of L'Enfant's birth name, "Pierre Charles L'Enfant". (See: Bowling, Kenneth R (2002). Peter Charles L'Enfant: vision, honor, and male friendship in the early American Republic. George Washington University, Washington, D.C.) The National Park Service identifies L'Enfant as "Major Peter Charles L'Enfant" and as "Major Pierre (Peter) Charles L'Enfant" on its website. The United States Code states in : "(a) In General.—The purposes of this chapter shall be carried out in the District of Columbia as nearly as may be practicable in harmony with the plan of Peter Charles L'Enfant."</ref> (Shortly after L'Enfant prepared this plan, its subject received the name "City of Washington".)

L'Enfant's plan contained the following explanatory note:

In order to execute the above plan, Mr. Ellicott drew a true meridian line by celestial observation, which passes through the area intended for the Congress-House; this line he crossed by another line due east and west and which passes through the same area.  These lines were accurately measured, and made the basis on which the whole plan was executed.  He ran all the lines by a transit instrument, and determined the acute angles by actual measurement, and left nothing to the uncertainty of the compass.

White House meridian

L'Enfant planned Washington around a right triangle, having its 90° vertex at an equestrian statue of George Washington, its eastern vertex at the "Congress house" and its northern vertex at the President's House, now named the "White House".

The west side of L'Enfant's triangle forms a natural prime meridian passing through the center of the President's house. The following ten features on and near this "Washington Meridian" are listed from south to north:

 The center of the Jefferson Memorial, completed on the meridian in 1943.
  The Jefferson Pier. In 1793 Secretary of State Thomas Jefferson surveyed and marked with a wooden post the southwest vertex of L'Enfant's triangle, establishing the second Washington meridian, the one through the President's house. The wooden post was replaced by the Jefferson Pier in 1804, while Jefferson was President of the United States. Azimuth to the Capitol is 89.98 degrees, a discrepancy of just under a meter.
 The German-American Friendship Garden on the Washington Monument grounds, dedicated on November 15, 1988.
 The Meridian Stone. Set In 1890 at the center of the Ellipse, it was intended to be on the same meridian. It is an  granite post set flush with the ground.
 The Zero Milestone. Set in 1923 on the north side of the Ellipse, it was intended to be on the same meridian and to be the zero mileage point for all United States roads (but never was).

 The center of the White House.
 Clark Mills' equestrian statue of President Andrew Jackson in Lafayette Park, erected on the meridian in 1853 (see: Andrew Jackson (Mills)).
 16th Street Northwest, which extends due north from the White House. The meridian is sometimes identified as the "16th Street Meridian" because of the location of this street.
 Meridian Hill. The marker, which no longer exists, was at the northern end of 16th Street, just north of Florida Avenue, before 16th Street was extended northward about 1890, covering it up. The park along the east side of 16th Street where the obelisk once stood still bears the name Meridian Hill Park.

Old Naval Observatory meridian

The third meridian was defined on September 28, 1850, by Congress: "[T]he meridian of the observatory at Washington shall be adopted and used as the American meridian for all astronomical purposes and ... the meridian of Greenwich shall be adopted for all nautical purposes." The observatory decided that this meridian passed through the center of the original (small) dome atop the main building of the Old Naval Observatory, now abandoned southwest of the corner of E and 23rd Streets in Foggy Bottom (north of the Lincoln Memorial and west of the White House). If NAD27, the latter would be  which seems to be within a few meters of the actual longitude, at worst. This meridian was repealed by Congress on August 22, 1912, to allow the Greenwich meridian to become the legal prime meridian of the United States.

Western state borders
Many western states have borders that are meridians of "longitude west of Washington", that is, west of the legal 1850 meridian through the Old Naval Observatory. However, their present boundaries follow the subsequently surveyed boundary, even when inaccurately marked a few miles (kilometers) east or west of the meridian in the statute. Other western states have meridians relative to Greenwich (Alaska, California, Oklahoma, Texas) or relative to a river or lake (Arkansas, Louisiana, Minnesota, Missouri, Oregon, Washington state).

The following meridians west of Washington are listed east to west, along with the appropriate boundary of the present state. The date of the meridian's definition is in parentheses (all in the 1860s). All states were territories of the same name when their meridians were specified except as noted. States without dates have boundaries dependent on the neighboring state with a date listed immediately above it.

New Naval Observatory meridian

The clock room is a small building at the exact center of the  radius observatory grounds, whose northern entrance is at 34th Street and Massachusetts Avenue. It was used in the Almanac for the years 1898–1950 as the independent variable of time for a few tables (even though Washington's civil time since 1883 had been that of the standard time zone GMT−5 hours (75°W)).

See also
Washington mean time
International Meridian Conference

Notes

References
 
 
  Note: Contains much information from book.
 
 Van Zandt, Franklin K. Boundaries of the United States and the several states, Geological Survey Professional Paper 909 (1976)
 American ephemeris and nautical almanac'' (Washington, DC: annual), preface and observatories

External links

 The 1791 L'Enfant plan and the Mall
 Map of L'Enfant's Plan
 Washington Monument GPS Project including Jefferson Pier and Zero Milestone (1.29 MB)
 Washington Refractor describing the condition of Old Naval Observatory in 1972.
 Washington Monument GPS Height Modernization Project listing coordinates of Jefferson Pier, Meridian Stone, and Zero Milestone (click on names for photos)

Meridians (geography)
Meridians and base lines of the United States
Named meridians
Prime meridians